La Sarrasine is a Canadian drama film, released in 1992. Directed by Paul Tana and written by Tana and Bruno Ramirez, the film stars Tony Nardi and Enrica Maria Modugno as Giuseppe and Ninetta Moschella, Italian immigrants in Montreal, Quebec. One day, Giuseppe breaks up a fight between a Sicilian tenant of the Moschellas' boarding house and Theo (Gilbert Sicotte), a French Canadian labourer who is also the son-in-law of Giuseppe's friend Alphonse Lamoureux (Jean Lapointe), and is put on trial for murder after his intervention results in Theo's accidental death.

The film's cast also includes Tano Cimarosa, Paul Savoie and Johanne-Marie Tremblay.

Nardi won the Genie Award for Best Actor at the 13th Genie Awards in 1992. The film also garnered nominations for Best Picture, Best Actress (Modugno), Best Supporting Actor (Cimarosa), Best Supporting Actress (Tremblay), Best Original Screenplay (Tana and Ramirez), Best Cinematography (Michel Caron), Best Art Direction (François Séguin), Best Costume Design (François Barbeau) and Best Musical Score (Pierre Desrochers).

References

External links

1992 films
Canadian drama films
Films shot in Montreal
Films set in Montreal
Films directed by Paul Tana
French-language Canadian films
Italian-language Canadian films
1990s Canadian films